The Neenah United States Post Office is located in Neenah, Wisconsin.

Description and history
Among the features of the building are a fanlight and a palladian window. Postal operations have since been moved to a different location, and this building has been converted into offices. It was added to the State and the National Register of Historic Places in 1990.

It is a Georgian Revival post office with fanlight and palladian window, built 1916-18.

References

Post office buildings on the National Register of Historic Places in Wisconsin
Office buildings on the National Register of Historic Places in Wisconsin
National Register of Historic Places in Winnebago County, Wisconsin
Colonial Revival architecture in Wisconsin
Georgian Revival architecture in Wisconsin
Government buildings completed in 1918